is a contemporary Japanese literary critic.

Bibliography 
  (1992)
  (2006)
  (2007)

References 

1958 births
Japanese academics
Japanese writers
Living people